O Segredo do Corcunda is a 1924 Brazilian silent crime film directed by Alberto Traversa.

The film premiered on 24 December 1924 in Rio de Janeiro.

Cast
João Cipriano as  João 
Inocência Colado as  Rosa 
Filomeno Collado as  Carlos 
Rafaela Collado as  Dolores 
Anunciata Madrigano   
Francisco Madrigano as  Pedro 
Rosário Madrigano   
Benedito Ortiz as Bento 
Nino Ponti   
Enne Traversa

External links
 

1924 crime films
1924 films
Brazilian black-and-white films
Brazilian silent films
Brazilian crime films